Giovanni Frezza (born 8 September 1972) is an Italian former child actor, diver, martial artist and product developer who appeared in a number of films throughout the 1980s. Frezza is possibly best recalled for his roles in several horror films.

Early life
Giovanni Frezza was born in Potenza, Basilicata, Italy.

Career
He made his film debut with a minor role the 1980 Marco Bellocchio-directed comedy-drama Salto nel vuoto (English title: A Leap in the Dark). Frezza then went on to play a variety of juvenile roles, most often in horror films. In 1981 he had a starring role in the gory, supernatural-themed Lucio Fulci-directed The House by the Cemetery as Bob Boyle, an imperiled child living in a sinister New England house. He worked with Fulci a second time in 1982's Manhattan Baby as the brother of a little girl possessed by a supernatural amulet. In 1982 he appeared in Enzo G. Castellari-directed post-apocalyptic Italian action film I Nuovi barbari (English: The New Barbarians).

Frezza would continue appearing in films until 1985. His last role was as Kirk in the 1985 Dario Argento-penned and Lamberto Bava-directed thriller Dèmoni (English: Demons). After retiring from films at age thirteen, Frezza concentrated on his studies.

Giovanni is currently working as a Director-Product Development at Molex LLC.

Personal life
According to his official MySpace page, he currently resides in Chicago and is a married father of three children who works as a Director for a multinational technology company.

Filmography
 A Leap in the Dark (1980) (Italian title: Salto nel vuoto, also known as Leap into the Void)
 The House by the Cemetery (1981) (Italian title: Quella villa accanto al cimitero)
 Heads I Win, Tails You Lose (1982) (Italian title: Testa o croce)
 The New Barbarians (1982) (Italian title: I Nuovi barbari, also known as Warriors of the Wasteland)
 Cuando calienta el sol... vamos a la playa (1982)
 Manhattan Baby (1982) (Italian title: L' Occhio del male)
 Mani di fata (1983)
 A Blade in the Dark (1983) (Italian title: La Casa con la scala nel buio)
 Demons (1985) (Italian title: Dèmoni)

References

External links
 
Giovanni Frezza at MoviePlayer.it (in Italian)
AllMovie.com

The Giovanni Frezza Page
 Giovanni Frezza's Official MySpace page

1972 births
People from Potenza
Italian male film actors
Italian male child actors
Living people